AMY-1-associating protein expressed in testis 1 is a protein that in humans is encoded by the MAATS1 (formerly known as C3orf15) gene.

Interactions
C3orf15 has been shown to interact with MYCBP and AKAP1.

References

External links

Further reading